John Aloysius Marshall (April 24, 1928 – July 3, 1994) was an American prelate of the Roman Catholic Church. He served as bishop of the Diocese of Burlington in Vermont  from 1972 to 1992 and bishop of the Diocese of Springfield in Massachusetts from 1992 until his death in 1994.

Biography

Early life 
John Marshall was born on April 24, 1928, in Worcester, Massachusetts, to John A. and Katherine T. (née Redican) Marshall. After attending St. John's High School in Shrewsbury, Massachusetts, and Holy Cross College in Worcester, he went to Canada to study at the Collège de Montréal in Montreal, Quebec.  Marshall then travelled to Rome to attend the Pontifical Gregorian University.

Priesthood 
While in Rome, Marshall was ordained to the priesthood for the Diocese of Springfield by Bishop Martin O'Connor on December 19, 1953. After a period of pastoral work, he completed his graduate studies at Assumption College in Worcester (1961–1968).  He then returned to Rome for more studies the Pontifical North American College(1969–1971).

Bishop of Burlington 
On December 14, 1971, Marshall was appointed the seventh bishop of the Diocese of Burlington by Pope Paul VI. He received his episcopal consecration on January 25, 1972, from Bishop Robert Joyce, with Bishop Bernard Flanagan and James Hickey serving as co-consecrators. His tenure in Burlington was marked by a decline in both vocations and church attendance, but he still founded Our Lady of the Mountains Parish at Sherburne, Vermont, in 1979. He completed the Cathedral of the Immaculate Conception in 1977, after an arsonist had destroyed the original cathedral in 1972. 

From 1984 to 1990, Marshall headed an apostolic visitation created by Pope John Paul II to investigate the doctrinal orthodoxy of American seminaries.  This visitation was viewed by the leaders of some seminaries as an attempt to force a conservative doctrine on them and stifle dissent.

Bishop of Springfield in Massachusetts 
Pope John Paul II named Marshall as the sixth bishop of the Diocese of Springfield in Massachusetts on February 18, 1992.

Death and legacy 
John Marshall died in Springfield on July 3, 1994, at age 66.  The Bishop John A. Marshall School in Morrisville, Vermont, is named after Marshall.  The Bishop Marshall Center is located in St. Michael’s Cathedral in Springfield.

In a 2007 civil lawsuit against the Diocese of Burlington, the personal file of Alfred Willis, a diocesan priest, showed that Marshall transferred him to a different parish after receiving sexual abuse complaints.  On February 27, 1978, three parents from St. Anthony Parish in Burlington accused Willis of sexually abusing a teenage boy on a camping trip in 1977, when Willis was still a deacon.  Willis denied the accusations.  A psychiatrist told Marshall that Wills just had odd habits.  In 1979, Marshall transferred Willis to St. Ann's Parish in Milton, Vermont, without notify the pastor or the parish of Willis' previous accusations.  Other accusations soon emerged from St. Ann's.  Marshall sent Wills away for treatment and initiated a church trial, which found Willis guilty.  Willis was eventually defrocked in 1985.

In 2008, a Colorado man sued the Diocese of Burlington, saying that the diocese was negligent in hiring a priest who sexually abused him as a minor over 100 times between 1976 and 1978 at Christ the King Church in Burlington.  Marshall had allowed Reverend Edward Paquette to transfer from the Diocese of Fort Wayne in Indiana, despite warnings from the bishop of Fort Wayne.  Paquette was ultimately accused of abusing over 20 children in the Diocese of Burlington.

References

1928 births
1994 deaths
College of the Holy Cross alumni
People from Worcester, Massachusetts
Roman Catholic bishops of Burlington
20th-century Roman Catholic bishops in the United States
Pontifical Gregorian University alumni
Assumption University (Worcester) alumni
Pontifical North American College alumni
Roman Catholic bishops of Springfield in Massachusetts